Mount Regan can refer to the following mountains:
Mount Regan (British Columbia)
Mount Regan (Idaho)